USS Zenobia (AKA-52) was an  in service with the United States Navy from 1945 to 1946. She was then sold to Chile, where she served as Presidente Pinto (AKA-41) until 1966. She was scrapped in 1974.

History
Zenobia (AKA-62) was  named after minor planet 840 Zenobia. Zenobia was also the name of the Queen of Palmyra who reigned from 267 to 272. The ship was laid down under a Maritime Commission contract (MC hull 1913) on 12 May 1945 at Providence, R.I., by the Walsh-Kaiser Co., Inc.; launched on 6 July 1945; sponsored by Mrs. Lillian V. MacDonald; and commissioned at the Boston Navy Yard on 6 August 1945.

U.S. Navy
Following her shakedown, Zenobia relieved  as a training ship with the Atlantic Fleet's Operational Training Command on 19 August. She served briefly in that role before she was reassigned to Service Force, Atlantic Fleet (ServLant), on 11 September. She operated with ServLant in 1946.

Although allocated to the Amphibious Force of the Atlantic Fleet on 1 April 1946, Zenobia's days as a United States naval vessel were numbered. She reported to the Commandant, 3rd Naval District, on 7 April and was decommissioned exactly one month later, on 7 May, at Brooklyn, N.Y. Struck from the Navy list on 30 November 1946, Zenobia was transferred at Brooklyn to the government of the Republic of Chile on 9 December 1946.

Chilean Navy
Renamed Presidente Pinto, the former Navy attack cargo ship served the Chilean Navy as a transport through the late 1960s, including being the yearly supply ship for Easter Island and figuring prominently in scientific expeditions there, and ended her active career as a training ship for midshipmen. She was transferred to "harbor duties" in 1968 — probably serving as a floating barracks or accommodation ship — and was replaced as training ship by the four-masted schooner Esmeralda. Presidente Pinto was probably scrapped in about 1974.

References

External links

NavSource Online: AKA-52 Zenobia
51 Years of AKAs

 

Artemis-class attack cargo ships
World War II amphibious warfare vessels of the United States
Ships built in Providence, Rhode Island
1945 ships